IGA Stadium (French: Stade IGA) (formerly Stade Du Maurier and Stade Uniprix) is the main tennis court at the Canadian Open tournament in Montreal, Quebec. Built in 1996, the centre court stadium currently holds 11,815 spectators. It was formerly known as Stade Du Maurier, after the cigarette brand. From 2004 to 2018, it was named Stade Uniprix, after a major pharmacy chain in Quebec. On Monday, April 16, 2018, Tennis Canada announced that it would change the name to Stade IGA, after a major supermarket in Quebec.

The twelve courts at this venue use the DecoTurf cushioned acrylic surface, the same surface as the U.S. Open Grand Slam event. The Canadian Open is part of the US Open Series of events leading into the Grand Slam event. Uniquely, the Canadian Open is held in two cities, Montreal and Toronto, with the men and women alternating venues each year. IGA Stadium hosts the WTA in even-numbered years and hosts the ATP in odd-numbered years.

Its core seating area is a remnant of the former Major League Baseball stadium on the site, Jarry Park Stadium, the original home of the Montreal Expos.

See also
 Jarry Park
 List of tennis stadiums by capacity

References

External links

Stade IGA site
Information at Tennis Montreal site

Tennis venues in Quebec
Sports venues in Montreal
Villeray–Saint-Michel–Parc-Extension
Outdoor arenas